23rd National Board of Review Awards
December 17, 1951
The 23rd National Board of Review Awards were announced on December 17, 1951.

Top Ten Films 
A Place in the Sun
The Red Badge of Courage
An American in Paris
Death of a Salesman
Detective Story
A Streetcar Named Desire
Decision Before Dawn
Strangers on a Train
Quo Vadis
Fourteen Hours

Top Foreign Films 
Rashomon
The River
Miracle in Milan
Kon-Tiki
The Browning Version

Winners 
Best Film: A Place in the Sun
Best Foreign Film: Rashomon
Best Actor: Richard Basehart (Fourteen Hours)
Best Actress: Jan Sterling (The Big Carnival)
Best Director: Akira Kurosawa (Rashomon)
Best Screenplay: T.E.B. Clarke (The Lavender Hill Mob)

External links 
National Board of Review of Motion Pictures :: Awards for 1951

1951
1951 film awards
1951 in American cinema